Brabus GmbH (stylized in uppercase) is a German high-performance automotive aftermarket tuning company founded in 1977 in Bottrop (Ruhr area). Owned by the company Mercedes-Benz Group since 1999 . Brabus specialises in Mercedes-Benz, Maybach and Smart vehicles, although in 2022 it also tuned two Porsches and even a Rolls-Royce. Brabus is the largest Mercedes-Benz tuner after Mercedes-AMG, a subsidiary of the Mercedes-Benz Group since the 1990s.

History 
The company began with Bodo Buschmann wanting to customise his cars. Discovering most existing customisers could not grasp his vision or meet his requirements, he started his own brand. Brabus GmbH was registered in 1977 in West Germany with Buschmann's friend Klaus Brackmann to satisfy German law requiring a company to be established with at least two people. The company name was derived from the first three characters of the founders' surnames (Brackmann, Buschmann). Following the company's foundation, Brackmann sold his company shares to Buschmann for 100 euros.

In 2012, Brabus had started building its third factory in Bottrop.

Operations 
Brabus's primary focus is to achieve maximum car performance through the increase of horsepower and speed. Customers can either buy cars from Brabus, or send in their cars to be customized and/or overhauled. Customers ordering a car directly involves Brabus purchasing a particular model from Mercedes and then modifying it according to the customer's requests. Brabus is known for providing expensive tuning.

Brabus also offers cosmetic modifications including low profile spoilers, body kits, carbon fiber splitters, and multi-piece alloy wheels. Other upgrades include racing LSDs, open racing exhaust systems, twelve-piston disc brakes, and engine remapping. Customers can also have complete engine overhauls, or have new crate engines from AMG modified for them.

Brabus engines range from small  K4 blocks for SLK roadsters and CLK-Class to the  twin-turbo blocks for the S-Class. The company also provides improvements to the interior from custom upholstery, gauges, shift knobs, pedals, and trim to various electronics such as wider LCD screens for the Maybach.

Subsidiaries 
smart-BRABUS GmbH: It is a 50-50 joint venture of Daimler AG and BRABUS GmbH, founded in 2001.
BRABUS Classic: It is a dealer and restorer of older Mercedes-Benz automobiles.
BRABUS Service GmbH: It is an authorized Mercedes-Benz service partner of Daimler AG.
BRABUS Yachting: It is a boats and ships customizer.
BRABUS automotive GmbH: It is a concept vehicle developer. The production facility was in a new plant erected in 2014.
CRD Car Research & Development GmbH & Co. KG: A developer and producer of special model series and accessories concepts for automobile manufacturers from around the world. It also develops and executes professional marketing strategies to market these components and cars.
STARTECH: A customizer of Jaguar, Land Rover, and Range Rover automobiles.
BRABUS Private Aviation GmbH: An aircraft customizer.
BRABUS Japan Inc. (BRABUS JAPAN株式会社): BRABUS GmbH's Asia-Pacific partner, and Japanese importer of BRABUS vehicles.
EXE Corporation (株式会社 エクゼ)/BRABUS EXE: Japanese importer of BRABUS vehicle parts.
BRABUS International Holdings (HK) Co. Ltd. (巴博斯中国): China importer of BRABUS vehicles.
BRABUS USA: Importers of BRABUS vehicles for Canada and the United States.
BRABUS Middle East LLC: Based in Dubai, it is a Middle East dealer of BRABUS vehicles.

Brabus models 
The company has built special editions of Mercedes-Benz, Maybach, Rolls-Royce, Porsche, and Smart vehicles.

Mercedes-Benz A-Class 

Brabus B18 (Mercedes-Benz A-Class, W177 Platform) 2.0 litre (A 180)
Brabus B25 S (Mercedes-Benz A-Class, W177 Platform) 2.0 litre (A 250)
Brabus B35/B35S (Mercedes-Benz A-Class, W177 Platform) 2.0 litre (AMG A 35)
Brabus B45 (Mercedes-Benz A-Class, W177 Platform) 2.0 litre (AMG A 45)

Mercedes-Benz C-Class 
Brabus Bullit (Mercedes-Benz C-Class, W204 Platform) 6.3 litre twin turbo V12
Brabus C V8S (Mercedes-Benz C-Class, W203 Platform) 6.1 litre V8 with enhanced camshaft profiles and higher output
Brabus C V8 (Mercedes-Benz C-Class, W203 Platform) 5.8 or 6.1 litre V8
Brabus C V8 (Mercedes-Benz C-Class, W202 Platform) 5.8 litre V8
Brabus C 3.6 (Mercedes-Benz C-Class, W202 Platform) 3.6 litre I6
Brabus B18 (Mercedes-Benz C-Class, W205 Platform) 2.0 litre I4 turbo (C 180)
Brabus B20 (Mercedes-Benz C-Class, W205 Platform) 2.0 litre I4 turbo (C 200)
Brabus B25 (Mercedes-Benz C-Class, W205 Platform) 2.0 litre I4 turbo (C 250)
Brabus B30 (Mercedes-Benz C-Class, W205 Platform) 2.0 litre I4 turbo (C 300)
Brabus 410 (Mercedes-Benz C-Class, W205 Platform) 3.0 litre V6 twin-turbo (C 450 4MATIC)
Brabus 450 (Mercedes-Benz C-Class, W205 Platform) 3.0 litre V6 twin-turbo (AMG C43 4MATIC)
Brabus D3 (Mercedes-Benz C-Class, W205 Platform) 2.1 litre I4 turbodiesel (C 220 CDI)
Brabus D3 S (Mercedes-Benz C-Class, W205 Platform) 2.1 litre I4 turbodiesel (C 220d)
Brabus D4 (Mercedes-Benz C-Class, W205 Platform) 2.1 litre I4 turbodiesel (C 250 BlueTec)
Brabus D4 S (Mercedes-Benz C-Class, W205 Platform) 2.1 litre I4 turbodiesel (C 250d)
Brabus D22 (Mercedes-Benz C-Class, W205 Platform) 2.0 litre I4 turbodiesel (C 220d)
Brabus D30E (Mercedes-Benz C-Class, W205 Platform) 2.0 litre I4 turbodiesel + electric motor (C 300de)
Brabus 600 (Mercedes-Benz C-Class, W205 Platform) 4.0 litre V8 twin-turbo (AMG C63)
Brabus 650 (Mercedes-Benz C-Class, W205 Platform) 4.0 litre V8 twin-turbo (AMG C63 S)
Brabus B30 (Mercedes-Benz C-Class, W206 Platform) 2.0 litre I4 turbo (C 300 4MATIC)
Brabus D30 (Mercedes-Benz C-Class, W206 Platform) 2.0 litre I4 turbo (C 300d)

Mercedes-Benz CL-Class 
 Brabus SV12 S Coupé (CL 600)
 Brabus T 13 Coupé (CL 600)
 Brabus T65S (CL65 AMG)

Mercedes-Benz CLS-Class 

Brabus Rocket (CLS-Class)

Mercedes-Benz E-Class 

 Brabus v8 B11 
Brabus E V12 (E-class)
Brabus used a Mercedes 5-speed automatic to handle the torque, and with rear-wheel drive, it reached sixty in 4.6 seconds.
 Brabus Black Baron (E-class)

Mercedes-Benz G-Class 

 Brabus G 3.6 (G-class)
 Brabus G55 AMG K8
 Brabus G V12 (G-class)
 Brabus  V12 S (G-class)
 Brabus 700 G63 AMG 6x6 
 Brabus 800 Widestar (G-class) — Brabus 800 Widestar is powered by a four-liter eight-cylinder twin-turbo engine. The top speed is electronically limited to 240 km. Brabus also offers a separate Widestar body kit that can transform modern G-Class SUVs to the Brabus 800 Widestar model.
 Brabus 900 G V12

Mercedes-Benz GLK-Class 
 Brabus GLK V8 (GLK-Class) v8 201
 Brabus GLK V12

Mercedes-Benz GLS-Class 

Brabus GLS 850
Brabus GLS 900

Mercedes-Benz ML-Class
 Brabus ML 63 Biturbo (ML 63)
Brabus ML 7.3 (w163) V12- 1998 Guinness world record.

Mercedes-Benz S-Class 

Brabus S500 (5.0l V8)
Brabus SV12 S Limousine (S)
Brabus T 13 Limousine (s 640)
Brabus T65S (S65 AMG)
Brabus SV12 R (S600) iBusiness (750 hp)
Brabus SV12 R (S600) iBusiness/ Limousine (800 hp)
Brabus 850 S63 AMG iBusiness/ Limousine (850 hp/1450 Nm)
Brabus Rocket 900 (900 hp/1500Nm)

Mercedes-Benz SL-Class, SLK-Class and SLS-Class 

The Brabus K8 performance kit for the SL model (SL55) includes modifications to the supercharger incorporating a custom vibration damper and pulley, high-performance metal catalysts, and an auxiliary circulation pump with an opposing radiator.

 Brabus SV12 S Roadster (SL600)
 Brabus T 13 Roadster (CL600)
 Brabus T65S (SL65 AMG)
 Brabus SL 55 K8 Roadster (SL55)
 Brabus SL 65 Roadster AMG (SL65 AMG Daniel Madar)
 Brabus SLK 6.5 (6.5L V8)
 Brabus SLS 700 BiTurbo

Mercedes-AMG GT 
 Brabus Rocket 900 "ONE OF TEN"

Mercedes-Benz Viano 
 Brabus 6.1 V8 Bi-Turbo (n, hk Viano 3.2 long)

Maybach 
 Brabus SV12 S (Maybach 57(S) / 62(S))

Smart ForTwo 

 Brabus Fortwo Edition Red - 35 Coupé and 15 Cabrio models.
Between 2006 and 2007 Brabus produced and sold 50 Smart Fortwo Edition Red cars for the UK market. All of these vehicles were originally produced with a black Tridion safety cell and black plastic panels, the car was then later repainted at Brabus in (EB6 colour code) Intense Red. The car was built with the usual Brabus additions to the exterior, these being Brabus front grill (with fog lights), Brabus front splitter, Brabus side skirts, black plastic Brabus rear exhaust panel, and 16-inch Brabus Monoblock alloy wheels. These vehicles were always rumoured to be Brabus Nightrun Fortwo's that were later reworked.

The interior was bespoke to this limited run of vehicles. The interior is half leather and half alcantara with red stitching. The seats use the smaller, non-sport foams. This is unusual as all other Brabus 450 Fortwo's use wider sports-style seat foams. The door card inserts are alcantara with leather door pockets with the dashboard finished in alcantara with an aluminium Brabus plaque displayed in the centre. None of these vehicles had heated seats or electric wing mirrors. All Brabus Edition Red Fortwo's are equipped with a 3-spoke steering wheel, bespoke floor mats, air conditioning, CD player, Brabus clock and rev counter, Brabus speedo displaying 120 mph, and all of the removable interior plastics (including door handles and steering wheel trim) repainted in Intense Red to match the exterior.

Designed on the base of the Fortwo Brabus, this limited edition example is powered by a 55kw 3-cylinder turbocharged engine although all of the upgraded hardware is from the 60kw motor with a different tune. Brabus upgrades over a standard 698cc Smart Fortwo include a 60kw camshaft, 60kw yellow Bosch injectors, 60kw turbocharger, 60kw turbo to intercooler pipe (TIK), Brabus branded central twin outlet exhaust with chrome tips, aluminium Brabus intake manifold name plaque and the gearbox from a Smart Roadster (different gear ratios compared with a standard Smart Fortwo).
 Brabus Canada 1 (smart fortwo 450 cdi coupé and convertible) - 4 made for Canada (3 red EB6), 1 white).
 Brabus edit10n (smart fortwo 451 70 HP coupé) - 10 made for Canada - all Grey metallic/tan leather
 Brabus Ultimate 112 (smart fortwo convertible)
 Brabus electric drive (smart fortwo electric vehicle)

Smart Roadster
Smart Roadster Coupé Racing RCR Edition 50 made by Brabus 
Smart roadster Brabus (slight hatchback design)
Smart roadster-coupe Brabus
Smart roadster-coupe Brabus biturbo - 10 made

Smart ForFour 
Smart forfour Brabus 
Smart forfour Brabus Hugo Boss special edition - 5 pcs.

Rolls-Royce Ghost 
Brabus 700 (Rolls-Royce Ghost) 2nd Generation 6.75 liter V12

Records 
 In 2006 Brabus Rocket clocked in new record for street-legal sedan at 362.4 km/h (225.2 mph). The Rocket was based on a modified Mercedes-Benz CLS-Class (W219) model.
 In October 2006 Brabus made another record (for a sedan) with this car at 365.7 km/h (227.2 mph). The price of the car is 348,000 euros.
 A world-record speed of 330.6 km/h (205.2 mph) set on the high-speed test track in Nardo, Italy; Brabus added to its extensive collection of automotive records with a Maybach 57 powered by a 730-hp (720 hp SAE net) / 537-kW Brabus SV12 S Biturbo engine(s).
 In the beginning of 2012, the world's fastest street-legal sedan was a Brabus Rocket 800.
The 2012 Brabus Rocket 800 is powered by a V12 engine rated at 800 hp and 1,420Nm of torque, which has been limited to 1,100Nm. The Brabus Rocket accelerates from 0 to 100 km/h (62 mph)in 3.7 seconds, 23.8 seconds to 300 km/h (186 mph) and has a top speed of 370 km/h (230 mph).

See also 
 Protean Electric
 Alpina, similar marque specializing on high-performance BMW models.
 ABT, similar marque specializing on high-performance Audi models.

References

External links 

Car brands
Mercedes-Benz
Electric vehicle manufacturers of Germany
Auto tuning companies
Auto parts suppliers of Germany
Technology companies established in 1977
Automotive motorsports and performance companies
Multinational companies
Companies based in North Rhine-Westphalia
German brands
Luxury motor vehicle manufacturers
1977 establishments in West Germany